Myriostigma is a genus of lichens in the family Arthoniaceae. The genus was circumscribed by German lichenologist August von Krempelhuber in 1874.

Characteristics of Myriostigma include the raised maculate (spots), ascomata-like fertile areas, asci that are 8-spored, thick-walled, globular and stalked, and ascospores that are hyaline, bean-shaped, and muriform (divided into chambers by septa).

Species
Myriostigma candidum 
Myriostigma filicinum 
Myriostigma irregulare 
Myriostigma miniatum 
Myriostigma napoense 
Myriostigma nicobaricum  – India
Myriostigma subcandidum 
Myriostigma xanthominiatum  – Brazil
Myriostigma xanthonicum  – Brazil

The species once known as Myriostigma guatteriae  is now Myriostigmella guatteriae.

References

Arthoniomycetes
Arthoniomycetes genera
Lichen genera
Taxa described in 1874
Taxa named by August von Krempelhuber